English is an unincorporated community in Carroll County, in the U.S. state of Kentucky.

History
English was founded in the 1850s. The community was named for James Whorton English, the original owner of the town site. A post office was established at English in 1876 and remained in operation until 1957.

References

Unincorporated communities in Carroll County, Kentucky
Unincorporated communities in Kentucky